The following is the list of the 70 stations on the Rotterdam Metro system in Rotterdam, Netherlands. The Rotterdam Metro has five metro lines, lines A through E. Line E is also referred to by the brand name RandstadRail, although it is operated by the same company as lines A through D. At Beurs station, one can transfer among all five lines.

See also 
 Rotterdam Metro
 RandstadRail
 List of metro systems

References

 List of Rotterdam metro stations
Transport in South Holland
Rotterdam
 
Rotterdam metro stations